White Bird: A Wonder Story is an upcoming American war drama film directed by Marc Forster and written by Mark Bomback, based on the 2019 graphic novel of the same name by R. J. Palacio. A spin-off, prequel and "companion piece" to the 2017 coming-of-age film Wonder, based on Palacio's 2012 novel, the film stars Ariella Glaser, Orlando Schwerdt, Bryce Gheisar, Gillian Anderson, and Helen Mirren, with Gheisar reprising his role as Julian from Wonder.

The film is scheduled to be released by Lionsgate in a limited release on August 18, 2023, followed by a wide expansion on August 25, 2023.

Premise
After the events of Wonder, Julian has left Beecher Prep for good. He is visited by his grandmother from Paris, who tells him stories of her childhood as a young Jewish girl in Nazi-occupied France during World War II, while being hidden from the Nazis by a distant classmate and his parents.

Cast
 Helen Mirren as "Grandmere" Sara Albans
 Ariella Glaser as young Sara Albans
 Bryce Gheisar as Julian Albans
 Orlando Schwerdt as Julian I
 Gillian Anderson as Vivienne

Production
Principal photography commenced in February 2021 in the Czech Republic.

Release

In January 2023, it was announced that the film was scheduled to debut in a limited release on August 18, 2023, followed by a wide release on August 25, 2023. It was originally scheduled to be released on September 16, 2022, but was later delayed to October 14, 2022. In September 2022, Lionsgate removed the film from its release schedule.

Locations gallery

References

External links
 
 

2023 drama films
2020s American films
2020s English-language films
2020s war drama films
American prequel films
American war drama films
American World War II films
Film spin-offs
Films based on American comics
Films directed by Marc Forster
Films produced by David Hoberman
Films produced by Todd Lieberman
Films scored by Thomas Newman
Films set in France
Films shot in the Czech Republic
Films with screenplays by Mark Bomback
Lionsgate films
Live-action films based on comics
Mandeville Films films
Participant (company) films
Upcoming English-language films
Upcoming prequel films